Abdul Kahir Chowdhury is a Bangladeshi politician. He was elected a Member of Parliament for the Bangladesh Nationalist Party in Sylhet-5 (Kanaighat-Zakiganj) constituency in the February 1996 Bangladeshi general election. He is currently the president of Sylhet District BNP. He was born in Bayampur village of Kanaighat in Sylhet district of Bangladesh.

References

External links 
 List of 6th Parliament Members- Jatiya Sangsad

Bangladesh Nationalist Party politicians
6th Jatiya Sangsad members
People from Zakiganj Upazila
Living people
Year of birth missing (living people)